Ted Cook may refer to:
Ted Cook (basketball) (1921–1990), American professional basketball player
Ted Cook (footballer) (Edward Cook), association football player who represented New Zealand
Ted Cook (American football) (1922–2006), American player in the National Football League

See also
Theodore Cook (disambiguation)
Edward Cook (disambiguation)